is a railway station on the Iwate Ginga Railway Line in the town of Iwate, Iwate Prefecture, Japan, operated by the Iwate Ginga Railway.

Lines
Midō Station is served by the Iwate Ginga Railway Line, and is located 37.3 kilometers from the terminus of the line at Morioka Station and 572.6 kilometers from Tokyo Station.

Station layout
Midō Station has two opposed side platforms connected to the station building by a footbridge. The station is staffed.

Platforms

Adjacent stations

History
Midō Station began as a signal stop on 1 November 1918. It was elevated to a full passenger station on 15 April 1961. The station was absorbed into the JR East network upon the privatization of the Japanese National Railways (JNR) on 1 April 1987 and was transferred to the Iwate Ginga Railway on 1 September 2002.

Passenger statistics
In fiscal 2015, the station was used by an average of 52 passengers daily.

Surrounding area
  Japan National Route 4
Kitakami River

References

External links

  

Railway stations in Iwate Prefecture
Iwate Galaxy Railway Line
Railway stations in Japan opened in 1961
Iwate, Iwate